Manampitiya Bridge is the second longest bridge in Sri Lanka with a length of 302 metres. It comprises 2 bridges, an early-twentieth-century steel bridge which is used for railway and a newly built bridge carrying 2 lanes of highway. Before the Kinniya Bridge was declared open in 2009, it was the longest bridge in Sri Lanka. The steel bridge was built in 1922, during the colonial rule. It is 291 metres long and less than 5 metres in width. Bridge is located 81 kilometres east of Maradankadawala, along the A11 Habarana-Thirikondiyadimadu road in Polonnaruwa District, linking North Central Province with Eastern Province over Mahaweli River. The new bridge in Manampitiya was built with financial assistance of Japan, hence the name Sri Lanka-Japan Friendship Peace Bridge. Japan International Cooperation Agency (JICA) provided LKR 1.3 billion on behalf of the Japanese government. Bridge was declared open on 25 October 2007 by President Mahinda Rajapaksa. The new 50 Sri Lankan Rupee note depicts the Manampitiya Bridge.

See also
Kinniya Bridge
Irakkandi Bridge

References

1922 establishments in Ceylon
2007 establishments in Sri Lanka
Bridges completed in 1922
Bridges completed in 2007
Bridges in Polonnaruwa District
Japan International Cooperation Agency
Railway bridges in North Central Province, Sri Lanka